Ambrose Papaiah Yeddanapalli (20 August 1914, in Pannur – 20 November 1997) was an Indian clergyman and bishop for the Roman Catholic Diocese of Bellary. He became ordained in 1943. He was appointed bishop in 1963. He died on 20 November 1997, at the age of 83.

References

1914 births
1997 deaths
People from Tiruvallur district
20th-century Roman Catholic bishops in India